PA14 may refer to:
 Pennsylvania Route 14
 Pennsylvania's 14th congressional district
 Piper PA-14 Family Cruiser light aircraft